Wanzihu Township is a rural township in Yuanjiang, Yiyang, Hunan Province, People's Republic of China.

Administrative division
The township is divided into eight villages and one community, the following areas: Jiahe Community, Wanzihu Village, Xiaohezui Village, Baishahu Village, Guanzhushan Village, Minglangshan Village, Lianhua Village, Penghu Village, and Yuzhou Village (加禾社区、万子湖村、小河嘴村、白沙湖村、管竹山村、明朗山村、莲花村、澎湖村、渔舟村).

References

External links

Divisions of Yuanjiang